Charltona consociellus is a moth in the family Crambidae. It was described by Francis Walker in 1863. The type location is listed as North America, but this is an error.

References

Crambinae
Moths described in 1863
Taxa named by Francis Walker (entomologist)